Lomandra confertifolia is a species of perennial herbs in the genus Lomandra, Asparagaceae, subfamily Lomandroideae. It is native to Queensland, Australia. Although it appears grass-like, it is not in the grass family.

References

confertifolia
Asparagales of Australia
Plants described in 1910